Russell David Lyons (6 September 1957) is an American mathematician, specializing in probability theory on graphs, combinatorics, statistical mechanics, ergodic theory and harmonic analysis.

Lyons graduated with B.A. mathematics in 1979 from Case Western Reserve University, where he became a Putnam Fellow in 1977 and 1978. He received his Ph.D. in 1983 from the University of Michigan with the thesis A Characterization of Measures Whose Fourier-Stieltjes Transforms Vanish at Infinity, which was supervised by Hugh L. Montgomery and Allen Shields. Lyons was a postdoc for the academic year 1984–1985 at the University of Paris-Sud. He was an assistant professor at Stanford University from 1985 to 1990 and an associate professor at Indiana University from 1990 to 1994. At Georgia Tech he was a full professor from 2000 to 2003. At Indiana University he was a professor of mathematics from 1994 to 2014 and is since 2014 the James H. Rudy Professor of Mathematics; there he has also been an adjunct professor of statistics since 2006.

Lyons has held visiting positions in the United States, France, and Israel. In 2012 he was elected a Fellow of the American Mathematical Society. In 2014 he was an invited speaker of the International Congress of Mathematicians (ICM) in Seoul. In 2017 a conference was held in Tel Aviv in honor of his 60th birthday.

Selected publications

References

External links

 
 

 (joint with Yuval Peres)

1957 births
Living people
20th-century American mathematicians
21st-century American mathematicians
Probability theorists
Case Western Reserve University alumni
University of Michigan alumni
Stanford University faculty
Indiana University faculty
Georgia Tech faculty
Fellows of the American Mathematical Society
Putnam Fellows